Callawalla may refer to:

Kallawaya people, an indigenous people of Bolivia
Kallawaya language, a language spoken by the Kallawaya people